The 1993 South Asian Association for Regional Co-operation Gold Cup was the 1st South Asian Football Federation Cup, held in Lahore, Pakistan (at Railway Stadium) between 16 July 1993 and 23 July 1993.
The countries that competed in this tournament were India, Nepal, Pakistan and Sri Lanka. Additionally, a Pakistan Junior team participated under the name of Pakistan White. However, their matches were not part of the tournament. This tournament was played as a league where the team which gets the highest points wins the competition. India won the tournament and became the first ever South Asian football champions.

Venue

Matches

Statistics

Champion

References

1993
1993 in Pakistani sport
1993 in Asian football
1993
SAff